The Food and Agriculture Organization of the United Nations (FAO) leads the programme Globally Important Agricultural Heritage Systems (GIAHS), which helps identify ways to mitigate threats faced by these systems and their people and enhance the benefits derived from these dynamic systems.

Globally Important Agricultural Heritage Systems recognize remarkable land use systems and landscapes full of life and biodiversity, resilient ecosystems, and valuable cultural heritages managed by farmers, herders, fisherfolk, and forest people. Communities that have preserved and developed complex, diverse, and locally adapted agricultural systems that nowadays provide sustainably many goods and services, food, and livelihood security for millions of people around the world.

As of March 2023, the GIAHS Programme has awarded the designation to 74 sites in 24 countries, with 13 additional proposals in queue.

List of UN-designated Globally Important Agricultural Heritage Systems

See also
 List of Important Agricultural Heritage Systems (Japan)

References

External links
 List of designated sites
 Map of GIAHS sites
 Photos of GIAHS sites

Globally Important Agricultural Heritage Systems
Organizations established by the United Nations
Agricultural organizations
Heritage organizations
History of agriculture